Charles Grimshaw may refer to:

 Charles Grimshaw (cricketer) (1880–1947), played for Yorkshire
 Charles Grimshaw (footballer), active in Belgium